Peter Michael Rentzepis (born 11 December 1934) is a Greek-born American physical chemist.

Education and career 
Rentzepis is a native of Kalamata born on 11 December 1934, Rentzepis attended the 1st Lykion in his hometown and graduated from Denison University and Syracuse University in the United States before pursuing a doctorate at the University of Cambridge in the United Kingdom, graduating in 1963. Rentzepis, who joined Bell Labs in 1963, after two years at General Electric, led the physical and inorganic chemistry research department at Bell between 1973 and 1985, and taught at University of California, Irvine from 1974 to 2014, serving in a presidential chair professorship from 1985.  In 2014, Rentzepis was appointed TEES Distinguished Professor at Texas A&M University.

Honors and awards 
Rentzepis was elected a fellow of the American Physical Society in 1972, and a member of the United States National Academy of Sciences in 1978. He won the 1982 Peter Debye Award from the American Chemical Society, followed in 1989 by the Irving Langmuir Award from the American Physical Society, and in 2001 by the Tolman Award of the ACS Southern California Section.

References

1934 births
Living people
20th-century American chemists
21st-century American chemists
Greek emigrants to the United States
Scientists from Kalamata
Denison University alumni
Syracuse University alumni
Alumni of the University of Cambridge
Members of the United States National Academy of Sciences
Fellows of the American Physical Society
Scientists at Bell Labs
American physical chemists
University of California, Irvine faculty
Texas A&M University faculty
General Electric people